Karahacılı is a village in Silifke district of Mersin Province. It is situated to the north of Turkish state highway  and Göksu River. The population of the village was 238 as of 2012. The main crops cultivated in the village are various fruits and especially pomegranate.

References

Villages in Silifke District